Yogaraj But is a 2011 Indian Kannada-language film directed by Dayal Padmanabhan starring Naveen Krishna and Neethu.

Plot

Cast

 Naveen Krishna as Yogaraja
 Neethu as Sihi 
 Suchendra Prasad as Paramatma
 Patre Ajith 
 Srinivasa Murthy
 Tharun Sudheer
 Sihi Kahi Chandru
 Shivakumar
 Amith
 A R Babu
 V Nagendra Prasad

Music

Reception

Critical response 

Shruti Indira Lakshminarayan from Rediff.com scored the film at 2 out of 5 stars and says "A fine actor like Sreenivasa Murthy settles for the role of a sanyasi who is meant to be scary, but doesn't quite pull it off. If Tharun Sudheer as the god of death, Yama, is meant to give us goose-bumps, well, he doesn't. Dayal has claimed that this is the best film he has done, but viewers might think that is not saying much". A critic from The New Indian Express wrote "Had the director avoided such incongruous sequences, Yogaraj But would have been a neat and good entertainer. Among the artistes, Neethu has done a decent job. Her gestures and dialogue delivery are good". B S Srivani from Deccan Herald wrote "Milind Dharmasena comes up with two good compositions and cinematographer B Rakesh and team does a good job along with the art department. Yogaraj But... could have been an excellent film but... Sunayana Suresh from DNA wrote "Just when you think all is well, Yogaraj dies in an accident. The film takes a twist when he convinces ‘God’ to send him back to earth. And there's the indigestible plot that follows through. The film has some good performances from lead actors Naveen and Neettoo". A critic from News18 India wrote "Yogaraj, But is a different type of film. But it is enjoyable to the core, and there is also a thought provoking element in the film. Watch it". A critic from The Times of India scored the film at 3.5 out of 5 stars and says " Naveen Krishna's understated acting and brilliant dialogue-delivery win your heart though it is Neethu who steals the show. Cinematography by B Rakesh is beautiful while Milind Dharmasena's melodious numbers linger in your mind long after the movie is over".

References

2010s Kannada-language films
2011 films